Romashin is a Russian masculine surname, its feminine counterpart is Romashina. It may refer to
Anatoli Romashin (1931–2000), Russian film and theater actor and director
Svetlana Romashina (born 1989), Russian competitor in synchronized swimming 

Russian-language surnames